Carlo Cornacchia (born 4 May 1965) is an Italian football manager.

Career

Playing career

In 1985, Cornacchia signed for Italian third division side Puteolana, where he made 18 league appearances and scored 2 goals. In 1989, he signed for Cagliari in the Italian second division, helping them earn promotion to the Italian Serie A.

In 1991, Cornacchia signed for Italian Serie A club Atalanta. On 12 April 1992, he scored a 14-minute hat-trick during a 4-4 draw with Foggia, the fastest hat-trick in history for a defender. In 1994, he signed for Ancona in the Italian second division. In 1996, Cornacchia signed for Italian third division team Rimini.

Managerial career

He started his managerial career as youth manager of Colorado Rush in the American lower leagues. In 2017, Cornacchia was appointed technical coach of French Ligue 1 outfit Nantes. In 2018, he was appointed technical coach of Fulham in England.

In 2019, he was appointed technical coach of Italian side Roma. In 2021, Cornacchia was appointed technical coach of Watford in England.

In October 2022, he joined Serie B club SPAL to serve as Daniele De Rossi's assistant coach. He was relieved from his post, together with De Rossi and his entire staff, on 14 February 2023.

References

External links
 

Italian footballers
Serie B players
Association football defenders
Serie A players
Living people
1965 births
S.S.C. Napoli players
Serie C players
Atalanta B.C. players
Rimini F.C. 1912 players
A.C. Ancona players
Italian football managers
Expatriate football managers in France
Italian expatriate sportspeople in France
Italian expatriate sportspeople in the United States
Cagliari Calcio players
A.C. Reggiana 1919 players
A.C. Prato players
Italian expatriate sportspeople in England
Expatriate football managers in England
People from Altamura
Footballers from Apulia
Sportspeople from the Metropolitan City of Bari